Paravastu Aananta Venkata Bhattandha Swamy (born  1934) is an Indian-born statistician. His research focused on econometric issues such as the simultaneous presence of measurement error, misspecified functional forms, and omitted variables.

After earning a B.A. in economics from Andhra University, India, in 1956, both an M.A. in economics and a M.S. in statistics from the same university in 1958, Swamy attended the University of Wisconsin–Madison. He finished his Ph.D. dissertation under the supervision of Arthur Goldberger in 1968. He then followed a conventional academic path leading from Assistant Professor at SUNY Buffalo in 1967 to Professor at Ohio State University in 1972. In 1974, Swamy joined the Federal Reserve System where he worked, first as an Economist, and then as a Senior Economist, in the Division of Research and Statistics until 1995.

References

External links 
 

1930s births
Living people
Indian statisticians
University of Wisconsin–Madison alumni
Ohio State University faculty
20th-century Indian mathematicians
University at Buffalo faculty